Terrill Byrd is a former American football defensive tackle. Byrd completed his college career at University of Cincinnati.

External links
 Cincinnati Bearcats bio

1986 births
Living people
Players of American football from Cincinnati
American football defensive tackles
Cincinnati Bearcats football players
Cincinnati Commandos players
Cleveland Gladiators players
Marion Blue Racers players